Bitkowo refers to the following places in Poland:

 Bitkowo, Gołdap County
 Bitkowo, Suwałki County